Grande-Clairière is a locality in southwestern Manitoba, Canada. It is located approximately 13 kilometres (8 miles) northwest of Hartney, Manitoba in the Municipality of Grassland, formerly the Rural Municipality of Cameron.  It was founded by French and Belgian settlers in 1890.

References 

Localities in Manitoba
Unincorporated communities in Westman Region